Garton is a surname. Notable people with this surname include:

 Abraham Garton, Spanish printer
 Adam Garton (born 1962), Australian rules footballer
 Alan Garton (1922–2010), British biochemist
 Andrew Garton (born 1962), Australian filmmaker and musician
 Billy Garton (born 1965), British footballer
 Brad Garton (born 1957), American composer and musician
 Cec Garton (1874–1908), Australian rules footballer
 Elizabeth Garton Scanlon, American author
 Gaby Garton (born 1990), American-Argentine footballer
 George Garton (born 1997), English cricketer
 Henry Garton (1600–1641), English politician
 James Garton (born 1887), English footballer
 Jim Garton (born 1901), British electrical engineer and activist
 John Garton (1941–2016), British bishop and theologian
 John Garton, British politician
 Johnny Garton (born 1987), English boxer
 Ray Garton (born 1962), American author
 Robert D. Garton (born 1933), American politician
 Ryan Garton (born 1989), American baseball player
 Stanley Garton (1889–1948), British rower
 Troy Garton (born 1988), New Zealand boxer